Cambodia is one of the six founding members of the SEAP Games Federation, but did not compete in the inaugural edition.

Medals by Games

 1 – Competed as Khmer Republic.
 2 – Competed as People's Republic of Kampuchea.
This medal table is incomplete; you can help by expanding it.

Medals by sport

See also
 All-time Southeast Asian Games medal table
 Lists of Southeast Asian Games medalists

References

 Beautiful First Goal Medal for Cambodia, Retrieved 2015.6.13